Humana.Mente – Journal of Philosophical Studies is a quarterly peer-reviewed academic journal of philosophy. Each issue focuses on a specific theme, selected from among critical topics in the contemporary philosophical debate, and is edited by a specialist on the subject, usually an emerging researcher with both philosophical and scientific competence. The editor-in-chief is Duccio Manetti (University of Florence). At present, the journal publishes papers in either English or Italian, but it is also open to contributions in French or German.

Sections
Humana.Mente is organized in four sections: Papers, Book Reviews, Commentaries, and Interviews. The Papers section intends to create a wide and stimulating reflection on the topics of the issue. Reviews focus on the latest books (dating back not more than 2 years prior to the publication of the issue) that relate to the issue topics. By contrast, the Commentaries section wants to re-open the debate on more "classical" books that deal with the issue topics, and possibly suggest a new perspective to interpret them. Interviews are open dialogs with notable scholars.

External links
 

Philosophy journals
Publications established in 2007
Quarterly journals
Multilingual journals